Triethylindium is an 
organometallic compound.

Synthesis
This compound can be obtained by reacting indium(III) chloride with a diethyl ether solution of ethyl magnesium chloride:

 + 3  → In(C2H5)3 + 3 

Other routes are also known.

Properties
Indium triethyl is a colorless, toxic, oxidation and hydrolysis-sensitive liquid. It is a monomer in the gaseous and dissolved state. The compound reacts with halomethanes to form diethyl indium halides.

Triethylindium is highly reactive with water:

In(C2H5)3 +  → In(C2H5)2OH + ↑

Applications
Indium triethyl is used to prepare indium phosphide layers for microelectronics.

See also
Trimethylindium

References

Indium compounds
Organometallic compounds